Copamyntis martimella is a species of snout moth in the genus Copamyntis. It was described by Valentina A. Kirpichnikova and Hiroshi Yamanaka in 2002 and is known from Primorsky Krai, Russia.

References

Moths described in 2002
Phycitini
Endemic fauna of Russia